The Macedonian Federative Organization (MFO) (Bulgarian and Macedonian: Македонска федеративна организация/организација (MFO/МФО) ) was established in Sofia in 1921 by former Internal Macedonian Revolutionary Organization (IMRO) left wing's activists.

History

Background
Reestablished in 1920, the IMRO became a formidable organization, with Pirin Macedonia as its stronghold. From its secure bases in Bulgaria it launched armed attacks and propaganda campaigns into Northern Greece and Vardar Banovina. Although it appeared as well organized group, it had its own left wing. In the early 1920s, the IMRO split over the ultimate goal of its activity. The right faction led by Alexandar Protogerov sought incorporation of all Macedonian territory into Bulgaria, while the left faction sought an autonomous Macedonia that could join Balkan Federative Republic. In December 1921, left-leaning deserters formed the official
Macedonian Emigre's Federalist Organization (MEFO). In 1922 another group of former Aleksandrov's supporters formed the clandestine Macedonian Federative Revolutionary Organization (MFRO). The only difference between the MEFO and MFRO was that the MFRO was determined for an armed struggle in order to achieve liberation of Macedonia.

Origins and goals

Violence between the two groups reinforced a political crisis growing public impression that Bulgarian governments were unstable. Both wings of the MFO supported the creation of a federal Macedonian state within a future Balkan Federation, which concept was similar to the ideas proclaimed by the Balkan Communist Federation at that time. The federalists' programme contained a bizarre formulation of a future Macedonian state using Esperanto as official language. The initial leaders of that movement were Filip Atanasov, Todor Panitsa and Hristo Tatarchev. Its adherents were commonly known as "federalists" by way of distinction from the IMRO-members known as "autonomists". As for the relations of the Organization with the Bulgarian government of Aleksandar Stamboliyski, it supported the federalist's movement and was openly hostile to the aspirations of the autonomists. MFO organized a number of armed forays into Pirin Macedonia (Nevrokop and Kyustendil), where it attacked the local IMRO detachments. In March 1923, Stamboliyski, in consequence of the Yugoslav-Bulgarian agreement reached in Niš, began cooperating with Yugoslavia against IMRO. Aided by the government, the federalists set out to destroy the military network of the enemy, but the autonomists scattered the federalist's chetas and launched an attack on the Stamboliyski's government.

Decline and dissolution

In the Summer of 1923, IMRO aided by radical officers, organized a coup d'état. The fall of the government was a great success to the power of IMRO. The government was condemned by the Communist International, as well as the absent communist resistance to it. When the communists aided by the federalists did try to revolt in the September Uprising, they were quickly crushed by the government and its IMRO allies. As a result, some of the fleeing federalists placed themselves in Serbian service, others collaborated with the Greeks. Panitsa also had to flee and went in Vienna, where the federalist's leadership began seeking foreign contacts, especially Soviet diplomats. They served as mediators by consecution of secret reconciling negotiations with IMRO. Continuing into 1924 secret negotiations between the federalists, BCP and IMRO representatives were conducted to unite all groups under the goal of independence or autonomy of a Macedonian state. The new position of the IMRO was identical to that of the Balkan communists and won for the MFO the endorsement of its policy by the Comintern. Lately IMRO officially rejected its support of the document and its leaders even denied endorsing it. In the aftermath of the failed agreement (the so-called May Manifesto from 15 May 1924) Todor Alexandrov, as well as key figures of the Federalists, were assassinated in the subsequent clash. Weakened the organization disappeared as a real entity. Most of its members joined afterwards the IMRO (United) and later the Bulgarian Communist Party.

See also
Macedonian Question
Macedonian nationalism

Notes

Sources
 Гребенаров, Александър, Легални и тайни организации на македонските бежанци в България (1918–1947), МНИ, София, 2006 г.,470 с.
 The Communist party of Bulgaria: origins and development, 1883–1936, Joseph Rothschild, AMS Press, 1972, p. 117.
 „Националноосвободителната борба в Македония, 1919 - 1941 г.“, Колектив, Македонски Научен Институт.

External links
 Statute of MFO (in Macedonian)

Modern history of Macedonia (region)
Bulgarian revolutionary organisations
1921 establishments in Bulgaria
Organizations established in 1921
Defunct organizations based in Bulgaria
Internal Macedonian Revolutionary Organization
Macedonian Question